Trollsteineggi or Trollsteineggje is a mountain in Lom Municipality in Innlandet county, Norway. It is located in the Jotunheimen mountains within Jotunheimen National Park. The mountain is surrounded by several other notable mountains including Trollsteinrundhøe to the north, Grotbreahesten to the northeast, and Glittertinden to the south.

The area around Trollsteineggi is almost completely covered with grass. The climate is boreal.

See also
List of mountains in Norway by height

References

Lom, Norway
Mountains of Innlandet